V. Kashiho Sangtam is an Indian Bharatiya Janata Party politician from Nagaland, hailing from New Monger village, Kiphire District. He has been elected in Nagaland Legislative Assembly election in 2018 from Seyochung–Sitimi constituency as candidate of Bharatiya Janata Party, he was Minister of Soil & Water conservation, geology and mining and chairman NSMDC in Fourth Neiphiu Rio ministry from 2018.

References 

Living people
Bharatiya Janata Party politicians from Nagaland
Nagaland MLAs 2018–2023
Year of birth missing (living people)
People from Dimapur